Murad Magomedovich Kajlayev (Murad Magomedovič Kažlajev) is a composer and conductor from the USSR/Russia, People's Artist of the USSR (1981), People's Artist of the Republic of Dagestan (2016), laureate of international premiums and contests, Artistic Director and Chief Conductor of the Great Academic Concert Orchestra named after Silantyev, professor and academician at Russian Academy of Natural Sciences.

Biography
Murad Kajlayev was born on 15 January 1931 in Baku to a Lak family. He graduated from Baku State Conservatoire from Boris Zeidman's composition class. He was expelled from there for his ardour for practicing non-academic musical genres but soon he was reclaimed. He worked as a teacher at musical school named after Pyotr Ilyich Tchaikovsky, in Makhachkala, as chief conductor of the Dagestan Radio Symphonic Orchestra (1957-1958), artistic director of the Dagestan Philharmonic Hall (1963-1964) and secretary of administration of the Union of Soviet Composers (from 1968).

References

1931 births
20th-century classical composers
20th-century Russian conductors (music)
20th-century Russian male musicians
21st-century classical composers
21st-century Russian conductors (music)
21st-century Russian male musicians
Living people
Musicians from Baku
Baku Academy of Music alumni
First convocation members of the State Duma (Russian Federation)
People's Artists of the RSFSR
People's Artists of the USSR
Glinka State Prize of the RSFSR winners
Recipients of the Order "For Merit to the Fatherland", 3rd class
Recipients of the Order "For Merit to the Fatherland", 4th class
Recipients of the Order of the Red Banner of Labour
Male film score composers
Male operetta composers
Azerbaijani ballet composers
Russian ballet composers
Russian classical musicians
Russian film score composers
Russian male classical composers
Russian male conductors (music)
Russian music educators
Soviet classical musicians
Soviet conductors (music)
Soviet film score composers
Soviet male classical composers
Soviet music educators